FEA, or Fighting Entertainment Association, is a European kickboxing and MMA promotion founded in 2009,  which promotes and organizes professional K-1 and MMA tournaments. These projects are popular especially in Europe and CIS countries. The owner and the president of the organization is Dorin Damir.

There are up to six FEA events per year. Each tournament consists of 15 to 19 fights, including title fights, with fighters from all over the world, as well as local Moldovan fighters.

The most popular FEA K-1 fighters within the organization are Stanislav Renita (Moldova), Pavel Zhuravlev (Ukraine), Constantin Rusu (Moldova), Artur Kyshenko (Ukraine), Samir Boukhidous (The Netherlands), Mladen Kujundzic (Croatia), Sebastian Ciobanu (Romania), Sergei Lashchenko (Ukraine), Sem Braan (The Netherlands), Yana Kunitskaya (Russia), Constantin Țuțu (Moldova), Massaro Glunder (Netherlands), Dmitri Bezus (Ukraine), Sergey Kulyaba (Ukraine), Zakaria Zouggary (Morocco), Ibrahim El Bouni (Netherlands), Tsotne Rogava (Ukraine), Sebastian Cozmâncă (Romania), Radosław Paczuski (Poland), Armen Petrosyan(Italy), Dennis Wosik (Germany), Tomáš Hron ( Czech Republic), Freddy Kemayo (France), Simon Santana (Norway), Roman Kryklia (Ukraine/Belarus), Zhora Akopyan (Belarus/Armenia), Cristian Spetcu (Romania), Mikhail Tyuterev (Czech Republic), Mihajlo Kecojevic (Serbia), Nicolai Caraus (Moldova), Vitalie Matei (Moldova), Alexandr Burduja (Moldova) and Esma Hasshass (Morocco).

The most prominent FEA MMA fighters are Valeriu Mircea, Alexandr Romanov (undefeated), Arslan Eslemesov, Martun Mezhlumyan, Luca Poklit, Mihail Sirbu, Mehman Mammadov, Dmytro Predebaylo,  Bogdan Barbu,

History 

The founder of FEA, Damir Dorin, got the idea of starting a professional fighting association back in the early 2000s, after visiting Japan and establishing a close relationship with the founder of K-1 fighting promotion Kazuyoshi Ishii. Eventually, in 2009 Dorin founded FEA and hosted the very first professional K-1 rules tournament in Chisinau, Moldova, which also included a Grand Prix tournament. The event was attended by K-1 stars like Ruslan Karaev and Artur Kishenko, chief referee of the tournament Ivan Ippolit and the president of the intercontinental federation BUSHIDO MMA and FEG representative in Europe, Donatas Simanaitis. This led to a partnership with the Lithuanian promotion IBF so in October of next year, FEA dabbled into MMA and organized a joint event, FEA Bushido FC, Moldova vs Europe, which consisted of both K-1 fights and MMA fights.

In December 2010, FEA together with IBF, started the King of Kings project, hosting 56 K-1 rules events in co-promotion over the following years and in numerous European cities. But the events which took place in Chisinau, Moldova, were fully under FEA responsibility.

In 2011 FEA registered the trademark “Fighting Eagles”  and organized another K-1 & MMA RULES tournament, including five fights in each section.

In 2016, February 27, FEA started a separate project, and trademarked the name EAGLES FIGHTING CHAMPIONSHIP, for a professional Mixed Martial Arts tournament, traditionally held in an octagonal cage. From that point on FEA organized approximatively three Eagles FC events every year.

The last co-promoted King of Kings event with FEA took place on 24 March 2018 and from then on FEA organized their own events under the name FEA Kickboxing.

FEA Kickboxing made its debut on the Ukrainian market on 24 August 2019 and hosted its event in Odesa. In December of the same year, FEA Kickboxing organized an event which included two Grand Prix tournaments, in the heavyweight and featherweight categories.

Due to the pandemic, all of the scheduled events for 2020 fell off.

In 2021, FEA resumed with a new concept and combined their two projects, FEA Kickboxing and Eagles Fighting Championship. Thus on March 13 of 2021, FEA technically hosted two events in one night: FEA Kickboxing Reset and Eagles FC Reset. Both took place in the cage and without an audience, due to restrictions.

On 13 November 2021 FEA repeated the same concept and hosted FEA Kickboxing, FEA Keep Grinding tournament, as well as Eagles FC Danger Zone on the same day.

In 2022 FEA decided to undergo a rebranding and renamed both their K-1 rules project and the MMA project to "FEA Championship". The decision surrounding the change of EAGLES FC is partly rooted in the fact that Khabib Nurmagomedov started his own fighting project in 2020 and named it similarly (Eagle FC) which created confusion among fans and experts. Further, this also helped to unite FEA's two projects under a single name.

Events were previously broadcast by Fightbox, Eurosport, Canal2, Canal3, Prime, 1+1 VIDEO, SPORT+, XSPORT and other cable operators. Currently, FEA has its own live streaming platform, feafights.tv.

Former and current commentators include Sandy Holt, Valentin Halacenco, Daniel Austin, Łukasz Czarnowski, Celian Varini, Daniel Kendrik, Gheorghiu Ivan, Nikita Vlasov, Pavel Zhuravlev, Vitalii Hurkov.

The ring announcers of FEA K1 are Rytis Kuzmenka, Michael Richie Diamz and Vladimir Marcoci.

The cage announcers for FEA MMA are Anatol Cotrobai, Michael Richie Diamz and Vladimir Marcoci.

FEA K-1 weight divisions 
At the moment FEA K-1 operates with the following weigh divisions.

FEA MMA weight divisions 
Currently FEA MMA has the following active weigh classes.

Rules

FEA K-1 rules 
The rules can be read on the following website.

FEA MMA rules 
The rules can be read on the following website.

Events

FEA K-1 EVENTS

FEA MMA EVENTS

Rankings

FEA K-1 Rankings
FEA K-1 Rankings

FEA MMA Rankings
FEA MMA Rankings (ex. EAGLES FC)

Champions

FEA K-1 current champions

FEA K-1 all champions

FEA MMA (ex. EAGLES FC) current champions

Champions of FEA MMA

External links
 Official Website FEA CHAMPIONSHIP

References

Kickboxing organizations
Kickboxing in Europe
Mixed martial arts organizations